Juan Gomes de Lima, the Juan Lima born in the São Paulo, is a forward who plays in the Grêmio Prudente.

Career
Plays in the Grêmio Prudente.

Career statistics
(Correct )

Contract
 Grêmio Prudente.

References

External links
 ogol
 soccerway

1991 births
Living people
Brazilian footballers
Association football forwards
Grêmio Barueri Futebol players
Footballers from São Paulo